Iain Crichton Smith,  (Gaelic: Iain Mac a' Ghobhainn; 1 January 1928 – 15 October 1998) was a Scottish poet and novelist, who wrote in both English and Gaelic.

He was born in Glasgow, but moved to the Isle of Lewis at the age of two, where he and his two brothers were brought up by their widowed mother in the small crofting town of Bayble, which also produced Derick Thomson.  Educated at the University of Aberdeen, Crichton Smith took a degree in English, and after serving in the National Service Army Education Corps, went on to become a teacher. He taught in Clydebank, Dumbarton and Oban from 1952, retiring to become a full-time writer in 1977, although he already had many novels and poems published .

Overview of work
Crichton Smith was brought up in a Gaelic-speaking community, learning English as a second language once he attended school. Friend and poet Edwin Morgan notes that unlike his contemporaries (such as Sorley Maclean and Derick Thomson), Crichton Smith was more prolific in English than in Gaelic, perhaps viewing his writing in what, from Crichton Smith's view, was an imposed non-native language as a challenge to English and American poets.  However, Crichton Smith also produced much Gaelic poetry and prose, and also translated some of the work of Sorley Maclean from Gaelic to English, as well as some of his own poems originally composed in Gaelic. Much of his English language work is actually directly related to, or translated from, Gaelic equivalents.

Crichton Smith's work also reflects his dislike of dogma and authority, influenced by his upbringing in a close-knit, island Presbyterian community, as well as his political and emotional thoughts and views of Scotland and the Highlands. Despite his upbringing, Crichton Smith was an atheist.  A number of his poems explore the subject of the Highland Clearances, and his best-known novel Consider the Lilies (1968) is an account of the eviction of an elderly woman during such times.

Elderly women and alienated individuals are common themes in his work.

Poetry
Crichton Smith's poetry quite often had a character perhaps based on his mother. He also typically used natural images to convey emotion.

His poetry includes:
 Culloden and After (1961) - an attack on that period in British history, especially "Bonnie Charlie".
 Old Woman (1965)
 The Iolaire (date)
 The Man who Cried Wolf (1964)
 You Lived in Glasgow (date)
 You'll Take a Bath (date)
 John Brown (KHS)(1966)

Bibliography
The Long River (1955)
 Bùrn is Aran (1960)
 Thistles and Roses (1961)
 Deer on the High Hills (1962)
 An Dubh is an Gorm (1963)
 Bìobuill is Sanasan-Reice (1965)
 The Law and the Grace (1965)
 Modern Gaelic Verse (1966)
 The Golden Lyric: an Essay on the Poetry of Hugh MacDiarmid (1967)
 At Helensburgh (1968)
 Consider the Lilies (1968)
 Ben Dorain by Duncan Ban MacIntyre (1969)
 From Bourgeois Land (1969)
 The Last Summer (1969)
 Iain am Measg Nan Reultan (1970)
 Maighstirean is Ministearan (1970)
 Selected Poems (1970)
 Survival Without Error (1970)
 My Last Duchess (1971)
 Poems to Eimhir translated from Sorley MacLean (1971)
 Love Poems and Elegies (1972)
 An t-Adhar Ameireaganach (1973)
 The Black and the Red (1970)
 Rabhndan is Rudan (1973)
 Eadar Fealla-dha is Glaschu (1974)
 Goodbye Mr Dixon (1974)
 Hami Autumn (1974)
 The Notebooks of Robinson Crusoe (1975)
 The Permanent Island (1975)
 An t-Aonaran (1976)
 The Hermit and Other Stories (1977)
 An End to Autumn (1978)
 River, River (1978)
 On the Island (1979)
 Murdo (1981)
 A Field Full of Folk (1982)
 Selected Poems 1955-1982 (1982)
 The Search (1982)
 Mr Trill in Hades (1984)
 Na h-Eilthirich (1983) 
 The Exiles (Carcanet Press, 1984)
 Selected Poems (Carcanet Press, 1985)
 The Tenement (1985)
 Towards the Human: Selected Essays (1986)
 Twelve More Modern Scottish Poets (1986) editor, with C. King:
 A Life (Carcanet Press, 1986)
 Burn is Aran (1987)
 An t-Eilean agus an Cànan (1987)
 In the Middle of the Wood (1987)
 Moments in Glasshouses (1987) editor
 A' Bheinn Oir (1989)
 Na Speuclairean Dubha (1989)
 The Dream (1989)
 Selected Poems (1990)
 Turas tro Shaoghal Falamh (1991)
 Na Guthan (1991)
 An Honourable Death (1992)
 Collected Poems (1992) 
 An Dannsa mu Dheireadh (1992)
 Thoughts of Murdo (1993)
 An Rathad gu Somalia (1994)
Ends and Beginnings (Carcanet Press, 1994)
The Human Face (Carcanet Press, 1996)
The Leaf and the Marble (Carcanet Press, 1998)
Country For Old Men and My Canadian Uncle (Carcanet Press, 2000)
 Am Miseanaraidh (first published 2006)
Iain Crichton Smith, Guardate i gigli, a cura di Silvia Campanini, EUT Edizioni Università di Trieste, 2009
 New Collected Poems (Carcanet Press, 2010)
 Deer on the High Hills: Selected Poems, ed. John Greening (2021)

Reviews
 Relich, Mario (1976), review of The Notebooks of Robinson Crusoe, in Burnett, Ray (ed.), Calgacus 3, Spring 1976, pp. 54 & 55, 
 Craig, David (1980), review of On the Island, in Cencrastus No. 2, Spring 1980, pp. 39 - 41, 
 Lothian, Andrew (1981), review of Murdo and Other Stories, in Cencrastus No. 6, Autumn 1981, p. 41 
 Craig, Cairns (1983), Crichton Smith: Poetry and Prose, a review of Selected Poems 1955 - 1980 and A Field Full of Folk, in Hearn, Sheila G. (ed.), Cencrastus No. 11, New Year 1983, pp. 44 & 45, 
 Grant, Jamie (1984), review of The Search, in Hearn, Sheila G. (ed.), Cencrastus No. 15, New Year 1984, p. 53,

Awards and honours
He was made an officer of the Order of the British Empire in 1980.

References

External links
Iain Crichton Smith publications on the Carcanet website 
BBC bio - Làrach nam Bàrd
Aberdeen University Celtic Department Experts on Iain Crichton Smith's writing, especially in Gaelic
The Contribution of Iain Crichton Smith - An essay on Crichton Smith's poetry, by Edwin Morgan
Iain Crichton Smith - An extensive exploration of his life, work, and legacy - Dissertation focusing on the Gaelic prose of Crichton Smith, by Alexander Shevellin
"Real People in a Real Place" and "Between Sea and Moor" Iain Crichton Smith's essays

1928 births
1998 deaths
Officers of the Order of the British Empire
Scottish atheists
People from the Isle of Lewis
Scottish novelists
20th-century Scottish Gaelic poets
Alumni of the University of Aberdeen
Scottish Gaelic novelists
20th-century British novelists
20th-century Scottish poets
Scottish male poets
20th-century British male writers